The Coupe Charles Drago was an elimination cup competition organised by the Ligue de Football Professionnel, between clubs that are knocked out before the quarter-finals of the Coupe de France. The tournament was founded in 1953 and was discontinued after the 1965 tournament.

Finals

Key

Results by team

References
General

Defunct football competitions in France
National association football league cups